Julien Francis Bontemps (born 1 June 1979 in Épinal, Vosges) is a male windsurfer from France, who won the silver medal at the 2008 Summer Olympics. He is married to Irina Konstantinova, an Olympic windsurfer.

References

External links
 
 
 

1979 births
Living people
Sportspeople from Épinal
French windsurfers
Olympic sailors of France
French male sailors (sport)
Olympic silver medalists for France
Sailors at the 2004 Summer Olympics – Mistral One Design
Sailors at the 2008 Summer Olympics – RS:X
Sailors at the 2012 Summer Olympics – RS:X
Olympic medalists in sailing
Medalists at the 2008 Summer Olympics
Mediterranean Games bronze medalists for France
Competitors at the 2005 Mediterranean Games
Mediterranean Games medalists in sailing
RS:X class world champions
21st-century French people
20th-century French people